Siersleben is a part of the town Gerbstedt and a village in the Mansfeld-Südharz district, Saxony-Anhalt, Germany. It is located 10 km north of the Lutherstadt (Town of Luther) Eisleben and 5 km south of Hettstedt and has a population of 1,472 people.

Former municipalities in Saxony-Anhalt
Gerbstedt